The 1998 Copa del Rey was the 62nd edition of the Spanish basketball Cup. It was organized by the ACB and was held in Valladolid at the Pabellón Polideportivo Pisuerga between January 30 and February 2, 1998. Pamesa Valencia won its first title.

Bracket

Final

MVP of the Tournament:  Nacho Rodilla

See also
ACB
Copa del Rey de Baloncesto

External links
Results and stats of Copa del Rey 1998
Linguasport

Copa del Rey de Baloncesto
Copa